"The Oval Portrait" is a horror short story by American writer Edgar Allan Poe, involving the disturbing circumstances of a portrait in a château. It is one of his shortest stories, filling only two pages in its initial publication in 1842.

Plot summary
The tale begins with an injured narrator (the story offers no further explanation of his impairment) seeking refuge in an abandoned mansion in the Apennines. The narrator spends his time admiring the paintings that decorate the strangely shaped room and perusing a volume, found upon a pillow, that describes them.

Upon moving the candle closer to the book, the narrator immediately discovers a before-unnoticed painting depicting the head and shoulders of a young girl. The picture inexplicably enthralls the narrator "for an hour perhaps". After steady reflection, he realizes that the painting's "absolute life-likeliness" of expression is the captivating feature. The narrator eagerly consults the book for an explanation of the picture. The remainder of the story henceforth is a quote from this book – a story within a story. 

The book describes a tragic story involving a young maiden of "the rarest beauty". She loved and wedded an eccentric painter who cared more about his work than anything else in the world, including his wife. The painter eventually asked his wife to sit for him, and she obediently consented, sitting "meekly for many weeks" in his turret chamber. The painter worked so diligently at his task that he did not recognize his wife's fading health, as she, being a loving wife, continually "smiled on and still on, uncomplainingly". As the painter neared the end of his work, he let no one enter the turret chamber and rarely took his eyes off the canvas, even to watch his wife. After many weeks had passed, he finally finished his work. As he looked at the completed image, however, he felt appalled, as he exclaimed, "This is indeed  itself!" Thereafter, he turned suddenly to regard his bride and discovered that she had died.

Analysis
The central idea of the story resides in the confusing relationship between art and life. In "The Oval Portrait", art and the addiction to it are ultimately depicted as killers, responsible for the young bride's death. In this context, one can synonymously equate art with death, whereas the relationship between art and life is consequently considered as a rivalry. It takes Poe's theory that poetry as art is the rhythmical creation of beauty, and that the most poetical topic in the world is the death of a beautiful woman (see "The Philosophy of Composition").

Publication history

"The Oval Portrait" was first published as a longer version titled "Life in Death" in Graham's Magazine in 1842. "Life in Death" included a few introductory paragraphs explaining how the narrator had been wounded, and that he had eaten opium to relieve the pain. Poe probably excised this introduction because it was not particularly relevant, and it also gave the impression that the story was nothing more than a hallucination. The shorter version, renamed "The Oval Portrait" was published in the April 26, 1845 edition of the Broadway Journal.

Critical reception and impact
The story inspired elements in the 1891 novel The Picture of Dorian Gray by Oscar Wilde. Five years before the novel's publication, Wilde had praised Poe's rhythmical expression. In Wilde's novel, the portrait gradually reveals the evil of its subject rather than that of its artist.

A similar plot is also used in Nathaniel Hawthorne's 1843 tale "The Birth-Mark".

There are similar elements in "The Fall of the House of Usher", such as a painter, his lover/model in a remote setting and especially their obsessions about inanimate objects that are living (the house of Usher, the painting in Portrait). In 1928 a French film-maker, Jean Epstein, filmed La Chute de la Maison Usher which combined both stories. Artist Richard Corben combined them in his 2012 adaptation after adapting each on their own.

Lance Tait's 2002 play The Oval Portrait is based on Poe's tale. Laura Grace Pattillo wrote in The Edgar Allan Poe Review (2006),

References

External links 

 Full text on PoeStories.com with hyperlinked vocabulary words
 
 "Life in Death" version from Graham's Magazine, April 1842.

1842 short stories
Gothic short stories
Short stories adapted into films
Short stories by Edgar Allan Poe
Works set in castles
Works originally published in Graham's Magazine